Hakea lissosperma, commonly known as needle bush and mountain needlewood, is a species of Hakea native to parts of south eastern Australia.

Description

It is a low woody plant with several main stout branches.

Flowers and Regeneration 
Flowers commonly form in late spring and early summer between October and December in alpine areas, earlier at lower altitudes. The fruit that forms after flowering commonly becomes hard and brown or grey-brown when it is mature usually in the second year after flowering. Immature fruit will not ripen off the plant and fruit is usually held on the plant for several years. Seed is usually not occupying whole valve face.
The seeds are wrinkled with a wing down one side only and dark blackish-brown in colour.

Taxonomy  
Hakea lissosperma was first formally described by Robert Brown in 1810 as part of the work On the natural order of plants called Proteaceae published in Transactions of the Linnean Society of London. The type specimen was collected in Tasmania on mountains between the Derwent and "Heron" rivers. The specific epithet (lissosperma) is derived from the Ancient Greek words lissos meaning "smooth" or "polished" and sperma meaning "seed".

Distribution 

H. lissosperma is found in Tasmania, Victoria, New South Wales and the Australian Capital Territory.
In Tasmania the species is commonly found in the following areas: Break O'Day, Central Highlands, Circular Head, Derwent Valley, Dorset, Flinders Island, Glamorgan-Spring Bay, Hobart, Huon Valley, Kentish, Kingborough, Launceston, Meander Valley, Northern Midlands, Southern Midlands, Tasman, Waratah-Wynyard, West Coast.
In Victoria it is found in the east parts including; East Gippsland, Fall Highlands, Victorian Alps and Snowy Mountains. In New South Wales it is found only in alpine areas in the south east surrounding the Australian Capital Territory.

Habitat 
The tree is frost hardy and drought tolerant to cope with its habitat.

Cultivation 
This tree should only be planted in a sheltered location. Seeds can be collected any time of year but only from older fruit which is usually grey-brown in colour.  The seeds must then be leached and the dry fruit will usually open in 2–3 weeks or place in an oven  for 30 minutes with the door partially open. Besides leaching stratification can also be used. Once planted the germination time is approximately 6 months.
The species is a favourite of birds due to the dense clusters of flowers and pungent rigid needle-shaped leaves which can be a shelter against predators. It is also resistant to wildlife browsing due to its unpalatability.

References

lissosperma
Flora of Tasmania
Flora of Victoria (Australia)
Flora of New South Wales
Taxa named by Robert Brown (botanist, born 1773)
Plants described in 1810